Antwan January (born July 29, 1999) is an American basketball player for Hillcrest Prep Academy in Phoenix, Arizona. January is from Los Angeles, California, and is a four-star recruit in the 2019 class.

In May 2019, January committed to play college basketball at the University of New Mexico.

References

External links
 http://www.espn.com/college-sports/basketball/recruiting/player/_/id/224501/antwan-january

Basketball players from Los Angeles
Living people
Power forwards (basketball)
William Howard Taft Charter High School alumni
1999 births
Beverly Hills High School alumni